Dametir-e Shomali (also Romanized as Dametīr-e Shomālī; also known as Dehnow Damītar-e Shomālī) is a village in Mehregan Rural District, in the Central District of Parsian County, Hormozgan Province, Iran. At the 2006 census, its population was 397, in 79 families.

References 

Populated places in Parsian County